Rapla (German: Rappel) is a town in central Estonia, the capital of Rapla County and the centre of Rapla Parish. The oldest records date back to 1241 in the Danish Census Book, when it was said that it was a small village with 8 acres of cultivated fields. By the end of the 13th century, the village centre was firmly established. At around the same time, a Cistercian monastery was built.

Rapla's ambitious period of fast growth began only in the late 19th century. In 1866, a pharmacy was built, in 1868 a school, and in 1888 a hospital. In 1898, a  brick factory was opened, and in 1900, a railway line was built between Rapla and Viljandi. The old stone church was demolished in the late 19th century and a new one was built in a Romanesque style, one of the purest examples of this style in all of Estonia.

In 1913, Rapla consisted of around 20 stone and 60 wooden houses. During this time period, a number of social societies were established, such as the Volunteer Fire Company, the Song and Music Society, the Society of Agriculture, a Mutual Fire Insurance Company, a Consumer Association, and the Deposit Insurance Fund.

It has a railway station on the Tallinn–Viljandi railway line operated by Elron. In 1931, a narrow gauge railway from Rapla to Virtsu opened and remained in use until 1968.

Gallery

See also 
 Cheleutochroa (Acritarch from the Rapla borehole)

References

External links 

 
Cities and towns in Estonia
Rapla
Kreis Harrien